The 2013 Challenger of Dallas was a professional tennis tournament played on indoor hard courts. It was the 16th edition of the tournament which was part of the 2013 ATP Challenger Tour. It took place in Dallas, United States between 4 and 10 February 2013.

Singles main-draw entrants

Seeds

 1 Rankings are as of January 28, 2013.

Other entrants
The following players received wildcards into the singles main draw:
  James Blake
  Robby Ginepri
  Austin Krajicek
  Rajeev Ram

The following players received entry from the qualifying draw:
  Jean Andersen
  Moritz Baumann
  Alex Bogdanovic
  Alexander Domijan

Doubles main-draw entrants

Seeds

 1 Rankings are as of January 28, 2013.

Other entrants
The following pairs received wildcards into the doubles main draw:
  Chase Buchanan /  Daniel Nguyen
  Neil Kenner /  Andrew McCarthy
  Daniel Kosakowski /  Vahid Mirzadeh

The following pair received entry from the qualifying draw:
  Sekou Bangoura /  Nicolas Meister

The following pair received entry as an alternate:
  Moritz Baumann /  Tim Pütz

Champions

Singles

 Rhyne Williams def.  Robby Ginepri, 7–5, 6–3

Doubles

 Alex Kuznetsov /  Mischa Zverev def.  Tennys Sandgren /  Rhyne Williams, 6–4, 6–7(7–4), [10–5]

External links
Official Website

Challenger of Dallas
Challenger of Dallas
Challenger of Dallas
Challenger of Dallas
Challenger of Dallas